Ladies and Gentlemen, The Suburbs Have Left the Building is a compilation album by the American New wave band The Suburbs that focuses on their releases from 1978 through 1984. The album does not contain any songs from their 1986 self-titled release. It was released by Twin/Tone Records in 1992.

Reception

Writing for Allmusic, music critic Stewart Mason wrote of the album "An excellent although not perfect introduction to the art rock and dance-pop world of the Suburbs... It's not all the Suburbs one will ever need—at the very least, In Combo and Credit in Heaven are essential—but it's a fine entry into the group for newcomers."

Track listing 
All songs composed by The Suburbs.
 "Love Is the Law" – 4:40
 "Tape Your Wife to the Ceiling" – 1:51
 "Black Leather Stick" – 2:47
 "Music for Boys" – 6:46
 "Rattle My Bones" – 3:29
 "Cig In Backwards" – 3:46
 "World War III" – 2:56
 "Baby Heartbeat" – 2:41
 "Goggles" – 3:21
 "Prehistoric Jaws" – 2:23
 "Cows" – 1:35
 "Monster Man" – 3:14
 "Cig Machine" – 1:26
 "Spring Came" – 3:18
 "Girlfriend" – 4:51
 "Drinking with an Angel" – 5:28
 "Waiting" – 3:43
 "The Best is Over" – 4:56
 "Chemistry Set" – 1:23

Personnel
 Chan Poling – vocals, keyboards
 Beej Chaney – vocals, Beejtar
 Hugo Klaers – drums
 Bruce C. Allen – guitar
 Michael Halliday – bass

References

1992 compilation albums
The Suburbs albums
Twin/Tone Records compilation albums